The 2008 Bangladesh–Myanmar naval standoff was a naval standoff between the Bangladesh Navy and the Myanmar Navy over disputed territory in the northeastern Bay of Bengal. The standoff ended after diplomatic negotiations. In 2012, the two countries resolved their maritime boundary disputes at an international tribunal.

Background
The Bay of Bengal has large untapped reserves of oil and natural gas. In November 2008, Myanmar allowed the South Korean company Daewoo to explore the seabed in an area 50 nautical miles SW of St. Martin's Island. The area was contested between Bangladesh and Myanmar as part of their respective exclusive economic zones.

Standoff
Citing international law, Bangladesh asserted that Myanmar should not allow any kind of activities in this debated territories till a solution. Myanmar deployed at least two naval vessels.

Negotiations
The Government of Bangladesh said Myanmar was operating well within disputed territory. The Foreign Secretary of Bangladesh Towhid Hossain summoned the Myanmar ambassador and later himself flew to then capital of myanmar Yangon with a team of Bangladeshi diplomats. Iftekhar Ahmed Chowdhury, the interim Foreign Minister of Bangladesh, vowed that his country would protect its sovereignty, territory and national assets with "all necessary measures". There was no statement from Myanmar.

Withdrawal
On 7 November 2008, it was reported that Myanmar withdrew its vessels and Daewoo began to remove its equipment from the area.

Arbitration
In 2009, Bangladesh submitted its claims to the International Tribunal for the Law of the Sea. Both countries came to terms at the tribunal in 2012.

References

Military history of Bangladesh
Military history of Myanmar